Daniel Torres González (born October 14, 1977 in Moravia) is a retired Costa Rican footballer.

Career

Club
Torres started his football career with Deportivo Saprissa, making his Primera División debut on 16 February 1996 against Ramonense. With Saprissa, he won several national and international titles between 1996 and 2001.

He signed with the Columbus Crew of Major League Soccer on September 8, 2001. In 2002, Torres appeared in 28 matches for the Crew, starting in 25 of them. He appeared in only eight games in 2003 before being transferred to his former team, Deportivo Saprissa, where he spent 2004 helping the club capture its 24th Costa Rican First Division Title.

In 2005, Torres signed with Tromsø IL of the Norwegian Premier League. He spent part of the season at the club before being transferred to Bodens BK in the Swedish Superettan. He played 11 games for his new club and was named “Player of the Match” five times. Torres made his return to Major League Soccer in the 2006 season, starting in the first 16 games for Real Salt Lake before suffering a season ending foot injury on July 14, 2006 in a 3–1 victory against the New England Revolution. He started in nine of the first ten games of the 2007 season for Real Salt Lake before being transferred to Bryne FK in the Norwegian First Division, where he played through the 2008 season alongside compatriot Carlos Johnson.

Torres signed with FC Dallas on January 27, 2009. He played during the 2009 season, but was waived at the end of the same season.

International
He played in the 1997 FIFA World Youth Championship, held in Malaysia.

Torres has been capped once for the senior Costa Rica national football team. His lone cap came on January 25, 2009, in a 3-1 victory over Guatemala at the 2009 UNCAF Nations Cup.

Personal life
Torres is a son of José Torres and Yadira González and has two brothers.

Honors

Club
Columbus Crew
 Lamar Hunt U.S. Open Cup: 2002

References

External links
 

1977 births
Living people
People from San José Province
Association football defenders
Costa Rican footballers
Costa Rica international footballers
2009 UNCAF Nations Cup players
Deportivo Saprissa players
A.D. Ramonense players
Columbus Crew players
Tromsø IL players
Bodens BK players
Real Salt Lake players
Bryne FK players
FC Dallas players
Liga FPD players
Eliteserien players
Major League Soccer players
Norwegian First Division players
Costa Rican expatriate footballers
Expatriate footballers in Norway
Expatriate footballers in Sweden
Expatriate soccer players in the United States
Costa Rican expatriate sportspeople in Norway
Costa Rican expatriate sportspeople in Sweden
Costa Rican expatriate sportspeople in the United States